Vanillylamine is a chemical compound that is an intermediate in the biosynthesis of capsaicin.  Vanillylamine is produced from vanillin by the enzyme vanillin aminotransferase.  It is then converted with 8-methyl-6-nonenoic acid into capsaicin by the enzyme capsaicin synthase.

Reactions

Acylation of vanillylamine using Schotten-Baumann reactions can provide amide derivatives. Examples include nonivamide (a component of some pepper sprays), olvanil, and arvanil.

References

Amines
Phenol ethers
Phenols